H32 may refer to :
 , a Royal Navy H class submarine
 , a Royal Navy H class destroyer
 , a Royal Navy R-class destroyer
 London Buses route H32, a Transport for London contracted bus route